Tony Rossi may refer to:

 Edgar Robb (born 1937), FBI agent who went undercover as Tony Rossi
 Tony Rossi (baseball) (born 1943), American college baseball coach

See also
 Anthony T. Rossi (1900–1993), Italian immigrant who founded Tropicana Products